Elachista ophthalma is a moth of the family Elachistidae. It is found along the coast of south-eastern New South Wales.

The forewings are brown, powdered with dark brownish grey-tipped scales. The hindwings are grey.

The larvae feed on Gahnia melanocarpa. They mine the leaves of their host plant. Pupation takes place outside of the mine.

References

Moths described in 2011
Endemic fauna of Australia
ophthalma
Moths of Australia
Taxa named by Lauri Kaila